, also widely known as , or Tomo, is a Japanese singer, actor, and TV host.

Yamashita joined the Japanese talent agency Johnny & Associates as a trainee in 1996 (age 11) and made his small acting debut for NHK's Shonentachi (1998) and has been active on Japanese TV since then. Yamashita made his official CD debut as part of idol group NEWS in 2004 and later debuted as a soloist in 2006. He got his successful acting career after an interesting portrayal as Kusano Akira for the hit drama Nobuta Wo Produce (2005). His biggest break as an actor came in 2006 when he landed his first lead role for popular drama Kurosagi. On October 7, 2011, Johnny & Associates announced that Yamashita and Ryo Nishikido were no longer members of NEWS, and Yamashita would be concentrating on his solo projects as actor and solo singer/idol. His solo music label was under Warner Music Japan until 2016. In mid-2018, Yamashita's music label moved to Sony Music Japan; however, Sony only managed Yamashita's music activities while his main career management remain under Johnny & Associates, which he left on October 31, 2020. As early as 2019, he signed a brokerage contract with Westbrook Entertainment, a brokerage company opened by Will Smith as he aspires to reach global audiences and overseas business territory.

Yamashita is widely known for his many popular dramas such as Nobuta Wo Produce, Kurosagi, Proposal Daisakusen, Buzzer Beat, Code Blue series, From Five To Nine 5-ji Kara 9-ji Made: Watashi ni Koi Shita Obōsan and more. His latest movie Code Blue the movie (2018) was the highest-grossing domestic movie In Japan for the year 2018 and #5 for all-time highest-grossing live action movies in Japan.

Early life
Yamashita was born in Funabashi, Chiba. His parents separated when he was a child, and both Yamashita and his younger sister were raised mainly by his mother. His real name is Tomohisa Aoki but he changed his surname to his mother's after his father left. His mother's name is Naomi Yamashita and his sister's name is Rina Yamashita. His nickname when he is young is 'Yama'. He is an athletic person ever since he is young. Since kindergarten, he started learning karate and got purple belt.

He became motivated to send in his application to the talent agency Johnny & Associates after watching one of Takizawa Hideaki's dramas and aspiring to appear on television like him. He sent in applications to many agencies but only Johnny & Associates called him for an audition. In 1996, he became a trainee under Johnny & Associates as a part of group Johnny's Junior. He debuted as a singer in a three-member Japanese band called NEWS and as a soloist in 2006. In 1998, he later debuted as an actor with a small role in 'NHK's Shonentachi'. Since debuting, he is widely known as 'Yamapi', short for Yamashita and Pink. The nickname "Yamapi" was given to him by Takizawa Hideaki as he forgot to wear pink clothing for a performance one time and was repeatedly scolded by his coach, 'Yamashita, Pink!', 'Yamashita, Pink!', much to everybody's amusement. His other nicknames include 'Pi', 'Tomo-chan','Pi-Chan' or 'Pii-Tan'.

Yamashita graduated from Horikoshi Gakuen's performing arts course for high school students in 2004. In Junior High, he joined athletes club. At Horikoshi, he shared a classroom with celebrities such as Koki Tanaka, Koike Teppei, and Yu Shirota. After graduating from high school, Yamashita was accepted into Meiji University's School of Commerce. He graduated with a Commerce degree (major in marketing) in autumn 2008.

Career

Acting

1998–2009: Early work
Yamashita made his acting debut in NHK's Shonentachi in 1998. He gained more attention after appearing in Ikebukuro West Gate Park in 2000. His biggest break as an actor though came in 2006 when he landed the title role in the television drama Kurosagi. He subsequently made his widescreen debut with the Kurosagi film sequel Eiga: Kurosagi in 2008. Yamashita also made his debut as a solo artist with the Kurosagi soundtrack Daite Senorita which went on to sell over 800,000 copies. He followed that up in 2007 and 2008 with roles as time-traveler Iwase Ken in the award-winning romantic comedy Proposal Daisakusen and flight doctor-in-training Aizawa Kousaku in the medical drama Code Blue. Proposal Daisakusen remains one of his most notable works, and in 2013, his character Ken's trademark line "" was selected by Oricon Monitor Research members as one of the most memorable signature phrases in Japanese drama history. Industry watchdog Nikkei Entertainment placed him at the top of their annual ranking of under-30 Japanese celebrities in 2008 due to his achievements in multiple entertainment fields that year. Following his work in the 2009 romance serial Buzzer Beat, Nikkei christened him the 'twenty-something ratings man', singling him out as one of the few young actors who could successfully lead romance dramas and possessed a stable ratings record despite the declining drama industry. Yamashita reprised his role as Aizawa Kousaku in the winter 2010 TV series Code Blue 2. Days after Code Blue 2 wrapped, Yamashita began filming for the live-action film adaptation of Ashita no Joe. Code Blue 2 and Buzzer Beat aired in Fuji TV's prestigious getsuku (Monday 9 p.m.) time-slot in Japan, making Yamashita the first person to have starred in two getsukus with only a single drama season in between.

2010–2019: Leading roles and hosting
From January to March 2012, NTV aired , a travel documentary chronicling Yamashita's cross-country trip across the historic Route 66. Then, after a two-year absence, Yamashita returned to the small screen with the 2012 winter drama Saikō no Jinsei no Owarikata: Ending Planner where he portrayed the role of Ihara Masato, the reluctant heir to a funeral parlor. He also co-starred with Shingo Katori  for autumn 2012 detective series Monsters.

Yamashita co-hosted Fuji TV's primetime Japanese variety show  from January 28, 2013, until its last episode on March 10, 2014. From April 20, 2014, Yamashita started hosting a new late-night variety show titled Otona no Kiss Eigo. Later in 2015 the staffs put his name on the title show and changed to YamaPi no Kiss Eigo, with new timeslot and new format games involving speaking English. In the same year, he started a new regular radio program titled “SOUND TRIPPER“ after his old radio program "CROSS SPACE" (2012-2015) ended few weeks before. In line with the new show's title, the interFM show presented chart-topping songs from US and UK charts of that year and was broadcast five days a week, from 8:05-8:10 in the morning. The radio program was aired from 2015 to early 2017

In 2014, Yamashita was cast as the male lead in the live action film adaption of the manga Kinkyori Ren'ai (近キョリ恋愛, "Close-range Love"), in which he plays an English teacher at a high school who becomes the object of affection of his student Kururugi Uni, played by Komatsu Nana. "近キョリ恋愛" topped the Japanese box office for three consecutive weeks, earning a total 1.17 billion yen. It was the only movie with less than 200 screens (179 screens) which managed to earn over 1 billion yen in 2014.

In 2015, Yamashita starred in two drama series. The first was the TBS spring 2015 drama, "アルジャーノンに花束を" Algernon ni Hanataba wo (2015), an adaptation of the Daniel Keyes novel, Flowers for Algernon., in which he played the lead character. In fall, he starred in the romance-comedy drama 5-ji Kara 9-ji Made: Watashi ni Koi Shita Obōsan alongside actress Satomi Ishihara.

In May 2016, Yamashita starred in Takashi Miike's TerraFormars, an adaptation of the popular manga with same title, Terra Formars. In early 2016, it was also announced that Yamashita would participate in a Chinese movie production, "ReBorn" (Chinese title) or "Cyber Mission" (Japanese title), in which he played his first villain character. He costarred alongside Chinese actor Hangeng and Taiwanese actor Rydian Vaughan. The movie was released on August 3, 2018 in China and January 25, 2019 in Japan In April 2017, Yamashita and Kamenashi Kazuya starred together again in the spring drama "Boku, Unmei no Hito desu ~ I'm your Destiny" . Yamashita played the role of a mysterious man who referred to himself as "God".

9 years after the first season, Yamashita reunited with the main cast of Code Blue for a third season which aired from July to September 2017. Repeating the success of season 1 and season 2, Code Blue Season 3 ended successfully as the highest-rated drama in summer, dominating Nikkan Sport Drama Awards, Academy Drama awards and some magazine drama awards. The Code Blue series finished with Code Blue the movie, released July 27, 2018. It topped the summer box office and live action movie rankings, and at the end of the year, took the crown as the highest-grossing movie in 2018 with more than 7.17 million tickets sold and 9.23 billion yen at the box office. Code Blue is the fifth domestic live-action movie to achieve this as well as the first in fifteen years to do so; the previous film to accomplish this was Bayside Shakedown 2 in 2003.

2019–present: International roles
In 2019, he starred in the spring drama series "IN HAND" as genius and eccentric Parasitologist Himokura Tetsu, the drama involving science research and its mystery. Since 2019, Yamashita is pursuing his acting career in international projects. Most notably, he starred as a lead actor in the psychological thriller series The Head, an international production of THE MEDIAPRO STUDIO and HBO Asia. As of November 2020, Yamashita will pursue his acting career and has his eyes set on more international roles. In 2021, he stars in the Hollywood production The Man from Toronto alongside Kevin Hart and Woody Harrelson.

Music
1996–2002: Debut with Johnny and Associates
Yamashita joined Johnny & Associates in 1996 at age 11. He started as trainee in a group called  "Johnny's Junior". Johnny's Juniors appeared on music shows as their senior's backup dancers, in addition to appearing on NHK TV's "Shounen Club". Several years after entering the agency, Yamashita became one of the most popular junior members. After Takizawa Hideaki debuted as duo group Tackey & Tsubasa in 2003, Yamashita was appointed as Johnny's Junior leader.

2003–2008: Member of NEWS
In September 2003, 7 years after joining the agency, Yamashita was one of the Johnny's Juniors chosen to be part of the idol group NEWS and he subsequently formally debuted on May 12, 2004. Yamashita was often referred to as the leader of NEWS in media but members of the group, including Yamashita himself, have stated at times that he was not the de facto leader.

Together with Kazuya Kamenashi, Yamashita released the single Seishun Amigo in November 2005. The single was the soundtrack for the drama Nobuta wo Produce, starring Kamenashi and Yamashita, and it topped the Oricon yearly charts in 2005. Seishun Amigo eventually sold over 1.5 million copies and is Yamashita's best-selling single to date.

2009–2013: Solo work with singles
In 2009 Yamashita returned to solo music activities with the release of his second solo single, "Loveless", and his first solo concert, ~Short But Sweet~ In 2010, he released his third solo single One in a Million which debuted atop the Oricon charts. This was followed by the releases of the single Hadakanbo and his first solo album, Supergood, Superbad, in January 2011. His first solo tour, "Supergood, Superbad: Asia Tour 2011" kicked off on January 29, 2011, in Hong Kong.

On October 7, 2011, Johnny & Associates announced that Yamashita and Ryo Nishikido were no longer members of NEWS, and Yamashita would henceforth be concentrating on his solo projects. Yamashita later published a message through the Johnny's web (Jweb) subscription service stating that this was a decision taken after much consideration on his part.

A chance meeting at a Lady Gaga concert before production began for the 2012 drama Monsters led Katori and Yamashita to co-author the drama theme song and formed a temporary unit named "The Monsters" to release the song as a single that would later top the Oricon weekly ranking. The Monsters came together again in 2013 to co-author the track PAri-PArA for Yamashita's third album A NUDE. As of 2013, all three studio albums released by Yamashita received the RIAJ (Recording Industry Association of Japan)'s Gold certification, indicating a shipment of 100,000 copies.

2014–present: Solo albums and tours
In 2014, Yamashita released two original albums: his fourth studio album, titled "YOU", and, later, a limited release of the dance mini-album titled "Asobi". After a two-year hiatus, Yamashita returned to music in January 2016. He released his first best-of album YAMA-P including previously released songs and the original song "Dreamer". The album reached #1 on the Oricon chart that week.

From June to August 2016, Yamashita returned with a nationwide concert tour entitled "Yamashita Tomohisa~The Best Live Tour 2016 Future Fantasy", his first concert tour since 2013's "A NUDE". Due to high demand from his fans, he added additional shows for Future Fantasy Yoyogi Arena in December, 2016

In April 2017, Yamashita and Kamenashi Kazuya reunited again after 12 years, naming their 2017 unit "Kame to Yamapi" and releasing "Senaka Goshi No Chance", the title song to their drama "Boku, Unmei no Hito desu ~ I'm your Destiny". The single topped the Oricon weekly charts and sold more than 160,000 copies. Again, they performed on music shows and participated in yearly music festivals. Similar to Shuji to Akira's Seishun Amigo, Senaka Goshi No Chance proved popular for its dance.

In mid-2018, Johnny & Associates announced that Sony Music Japan (SME Japan) would act as Yamashita's new music label and his comeback to his music career after 4 years without any major release. His first SME release, "UNLEASHED", was released November 28, 2018, containing songs mostly written and produced by himself; he wrote 11 of the album's 12 tracks. He also conducted nationwide concert tours from September through December 2018. Although Sony Music Japan serves as Yamashita's new music label since then, his main career management remained under Johnny & Associates until October 31, 2020.

Yamashita was chosen to sing the opening song for the popular anime series "Ace Attorney, season 2". The song, called "Never Lose", was released February 13, 2019. On June 19, 2019, Yamashita's new single "Change"'' was released, the title song to his new drama "IN HAND" which he had composed and written.

On November 11, 2020, Johnny & Associates announced that Yamashita has left Johnny & Associates on October 31. On his Instagram account, Yamashita stated that he wants to chase his childhood dreams.

Public image

In July 2020, Tomohisa was announced as one of the guest speakers for the "2020 Tomorrowland Around the World Inspiration Sessions festival". He was one of 16 guest speakers as an international role model. In March 2021, Yamashita was officially announced as a Bulgari ambassador.  In May 2021, Yamashita was officially announced as a beauty ambassador for Dior.

Discography
For releases as NEWS, Shuuji to Akira, and Kitty GYM, see NEWS' Discography, Shuuji to Akira's Single, and Kitty GYM

Studio albums

Mini albums

Singles

DVD & Blu-ray

Collaborations and features

Composing and song-writing

Concerts

Filmography

Television drama

Film

Recognition 

29th TV LIFE Annual Drama Awards 2019: Best Actor for In Hand
29th TV LIFE Annual Drama Awards 2019: In Hand :Music Award CHANGE
TV station + digital Drama Awards 2019: Best Actor for In Hand
23rd Nikkan Sports Drama Grand Prix (Apr-Jun 2019):Best Actor for  In Hand
TV station Drama Awards (2017): Best Actor for Code Blue 3
94th Television Drama Academy Awards (Jul-Sep 2017): Best Actor for Code Blue 3
21st Nikkan Sports Drama Grand Prix (Jul-Sep 2017): Best Actor for Code Blue 3
 21st Nikkan Sports Drama Grand Prix (Apr-Jun 2017): Best Supporting Actor for Boku, Unmei no Hito desu
 19th Nikkan Sports Drama Grand Prix (Annual): Best Actor for Algernon ni Hanataba wo
 19th Nikkan Sports Drama Grand Prix (Annual): Best Supporting Actor for 5-ji Kara 9-ji Made
 19th Nikkan Sports Drama Grand Prix (Oct-Dec 2015): Best Supporting Actor for 5-ji Kara 9-ji Made
 19th Nikkan Sports Drama Grand Prix (Apr-Jun 2015): Best Actor for Algernon ni Hanataba wo
 15th Nikkan Sports Drama Grand Prix (Jan-Mar 2012): Best Actor for Saikou no Jinsei no Owarikata~Ending Planner~
 13th Nikkan Sports Drama Grand Prix (Summer 2009): Best Actor for Buzzer Beat
 11th Nikkan Sports Drama Grand Prix (Spring 2007): Best Actor for Proposal Daisakusen
 9th Nikkan Sports Drama Grand Prix (2005–06): Best Actor for Nobuta wo Produce
 4th Nikkan Sports Drama Grand Prix (2000–01): Best Newcomer for Ikebukuro West Gate Park
 Annual Junior Awards: 'Best Boyfriend', 'Most Beautiful', etc. (2000)

References

External links
TOMOHISA YAMASHITA Official Web-Site
TOMOHISA YAMASHITA - IMDb

1985 births
Japanese idols
Japanese male pop singers
Japanese male television actors
Japanese male film actors
Japanese male child actors
Japanese baritones
English-language singers from Japan
Living people
People from Funabashi
News (band) members
Johnny & Associates
20th-century Japanese male actors
Musicians from Chiba Prefecture
21st-century Japanese male actors
20th-century Japanese male singers
20th-century Japanese singers
21st-century Japanese male singers
21st-century Japanese singers